Nebraska Highway 14 (N-14) is a highway in the U.S. state of Nebraska. It has a southern terminus at the Kansas border, where it continues south as K-14, southwest of Superior and a northern terminus east of Niobrara at the South Dakota border.

Route description
Nebraska Highway 14 begins at the Kansas border southwest of Superior. This southern terminus for NE 14 is also the northern terminus for K-14. It goes northeast through farmland towards Superior, crosses the Republican River, then turns east into Superior. It meets Nebraska Highway 8 there, then turns north. They separate, and NE 14 continues north into Nelson. It continues north, runs briefly concurrent with Nebraska Highway 4 and Nebraska Highway 74, then goes through Clay Center. At Clay Center, it meets Nebraska Highway 41. It turns north, and shortly before arriving in Aurora, intersects Interstate 80. In Aurora, it meets U.S. Highway 34. It continues north and meets Nebraska Highway 66 just before passing the Platte River. It crosses the Platte, and enters Central City, where it meets U.S. Highway 30.

After Central City, it briefly overlaps Nebraska Highway 92 before continuing north towards Fullerton.  At Fullerton, it meets Nebraska Highway 22 and they run together north for a couple miles.  It goes north and shortly before Albion, meets Nebraska Highway 39 and turns northwesterly to go through Albion.  At Loretto, it turns due north again, then north of Elgin, it turns northeasterly towards Neligh.  At Neligh, NE 14 meets U.S. Highway 275.  It continues due north out of Neligh, meeting U.S. Highway 20 near Brunswick.  It continues north through Verdigre and at Niobrara meets Nebraska Highway 12.  It turns east briefly, then turns north to go into South Dakota via the Chief Standing Bear Memorial Bridge, which crosses the Missouri River, where the highway continues north as South Dakota Highway 37.

History
Nebraska Highway 14 originally ended in Neligh.  It  also originally went east from Fullerton to Genoa along the current NE 22, then northwest to Albion along current NE 39. When originally extended to Niobrara, it went north through Center along the current Nebraska Highway 13.

Nebraska Highway 14 previously ended in Niobrara, but in 1998, the Chief Standing Bear Memorial Bridge was opened.  The bridge, which was named for the former Ponca Indian chief, crosses over the Missouri River and replaced a long-standing river ferry which crossed at the same site. The completion of this bridge made it a cross-state highway.

Highway designations
The portion it shares with U.S. Highway 136 is the Heritage Highway.  When it is concurrent with U.S. Highway 6, it is the Grand Army of the Republic Highway.  Its concurrency with Nebraska Highway 12 is the Outlaw Trail Scenic Byway.

Major intersections

References

014
Transportation in Nuckolls County, Nebraska
Transportation in Clay County, Nebraska
Transportation in Hamilton County, Nebraska
Transportation in Merrick County, Nebraska
Transportation in Nance County, Nebraska
Transportation in Boone County, Nebraska
Transportation in Antelope County, Nebraska
Transportation in Knox County, Nebraska